The Cleansing may refer to:

The Cleansing (Suicide Silence album)
The Cleansing (John Zorn & Bill Laswell album)
The Cleansing (novel), horror novel by John D. Harvey
The Cleansing (song), by In Case of Fire

See also
Cleansing (disambiguation)
Ethnic cleansing